Theognostus (died 11 March 1353) was a bishop of the Ecumenical Patriarch of Constantinople who served as Metropolitan of Kiev and all Rus'.

Life 
Theognostus was born in Constantinople and later in his life became Peter's successor as Metropolitan of Kiev and all Rus'. He chose Moscow as his primary seat after he had lived for several years in Volodymyr-Volynskyi in Volynia.

It was his lot to reconcile Novgorod with the Grand Duchy of Moscow in times of their mutual animosity. Theognostus managed to save all of the Russian churches' valuables and gave up all his personal property after he had refused to collect tribute from the churches in favor of the Golden Horde. He was tortured by the Tatars for such audacity. It was the Khan who finally gave up and confirmed the existing privileges of the Russian Orthodox Church. After a fire swept through Moscow, Theognostus started to restore the churches.

In 1353, feeling that his days were numbered, Theognostus recommended Alexius (Bishop of Vladimir) his successor. Theognostus was buried in the Cathedral of the Dormition in Moscow. He was canonized by the Russian Orthodox Church in the 19th century.

References

Russian saints
Metropolitans of Kiev and all Rus' (988–1441)
1353 deaths
People from Constantinople
14th-century Christian saints
14th-century Eastern Orthodox martyrs
Year of birth unknown
Russian people of Greek descent
14th-century Byzantine people
Byzantine saints of the Eastern Orthodox Church